Ripley is an unincorporated community in Twiggs County, in the U.S. state of Georgia.

History
A post office called Ripley was established in 1892, and remained in operation until 1921. A variant name was "Ripling".

References

Unincorporated communities in Twiggs County, Georgia
Unincorporated communities in Georgia (U.S. state)